Snow socks (also known as auto socks) are textile alternatives to snow chains. Snow sock devices wrap around the tires of a vehicle to increase traction on snow and ice. Snow socks are normally composed of a woven fabric with an elastomer attached to the inner and/or outer edge. The woven fabric covers the tire tread and is the contact point between the vehicle and the road. The elastomer keeps the snow sock in place and facilitates with installation. Some snow sock models have an additional component that covers the rim of the tire, which prevents snow or debris from gathering between the tread of the tire and the inner side of the woven fabric.

Sizing and deployment 
Snow socks are sold in pairs and come in sizes that are specific to a range of tire codes. Snow sock sizes are available for different motor vehicle classes, but most snow sock brands focus on cars and pickup trucks rather than semi-trailer trucks or larger vehicles. Since the largest variation of snow socks is in the market for cars and pickup trucks, wide or low-profile tires are often covered. Buses, semi-trailer trucks or larger vehicles require snow sock models that can support the heavier axle load and larger wheel dimensions. Some brands also offer snow socks for specialized vehicles such as forklifts or airport ground support equipment (e.g. pushback tugs or loaders).

These restrictions are normally stated in the product's or vehicle's owner’s manual. Neither snow socks nor snow chains are considered direct substitutes to snow tires.

Legality of use 
During inclement weather, regions may invoke snow chain laws as a precautionary measure. Snow socks are generally not considered a legal equivalent to snow chains, though some brands are individually approved.

If snow chains are prohibited, snow socks without metal components may be permitted. This depends on local legislature.

Textile snow socks

This is a cover in textile that covers the tire and insulates the tire from snow. They do not disturb safety systems (ABS, ESP) or damage aluminum rims.

One important component is polyester. The fibres absorb the water and improve grip.

Snow socks made of composite materials

Michelin manufactures a composite snow sock called Easy Grip. It is coupled with an inner elastic band to facilitate installation. To strengthen the tread and maximize road holding there are 150 galvanised steel rings.

Benefits of snow socks

Snow socks offer added benefit in that they do not disturb the safety systems on a vehicle such as ESP or ABS.

See also
Snow chains
Snow tire

References

Inclement weather management
Vehicle safety technologies